Mason Hollyman (born 25 June 2000) is a British cyclist, who currently rides for UCI ProTeam .

Major results

2017
 6th Overall Giro di Basilicata
1st Stage 2
2018
 3rd Overall Driedaagse van Axel
 6th Trofeo Buffoni
2020
 9th Overall Tour of Bulgaria
2021
 1st Trofeo Andratx U23
 1st Stage 5 Volta a Portugal
 9th Overall Troféu Joaquim Agostinho
2022
 1st Stage 1 Giro della Valle d'Aosta
 4th Trofeo Piva
 5th Liège–Bastogne–Liège Espoirs
 6th Overall Alpes Isère Tour

References

External links

2000 births
Living people
English male cyclists
Sportspeople from Huddersfield